is one of the 100 Famous Japanese Mountains. The  mountain lies on the border of Taketa and Bungo-ōno in Ōita Prefecture and Takachiho, Nishiusuki District in Miyazaki Prefecture. It is within the Sobo, Katamuki and Okue Biosphere Reserve. Mount Sobo is the highest peak in Miyazaki Prefecture and in Ōita Prefecture only the  middle peak of Mount Kujū is higher.

The Sobo Mountain range extends into three prefectures: Ōita, Miyazaki and Kumamoto.
Because of the volcanic activity which formed the mountain, huge rocks can be found everywhere around the mountain. There is a great variety of mountain climbing routes, ranging from animal trails to well maintained paths. Courses ae available from relaxed hiking for enjoyment to cliff climbing routes aimed at advanced climbers. Steep rock climbing routes can be seen from all trails in the neighbourhood of the summit.
The surroundings of Mount Sobo abound in mineral resources which were mined from the Edo period to the mid-Shōwa period.

Formation 
It is believed that the foundation of  the Sobo mountain range occurred in two periods of volcanic activity. The two cauldrons formed at this time, were buried in the second period of volcanic activity leaving the caldera which can be seen today.

About 12.5 million years ago, a cauldron opened up once more. During this time ore was formed. Around 10 million years ago the volcanic activity ceased. Erosion levelled off the mountain until 3 million years ago when the large scale activity of the rising Mount Aso system caused a pyroclastic flow which gave Mount Sobo its present shape.

Environment 
Thanks to volcanic activity, granite is ubiquitous. In the valleys at the bottom of the mountain and at medium and high altitude rock-climbing fans are fascinated by the cliffs which can be found everywhere.

Miyama Kirishima (Rhododendron kiusianum), Japanese gentian and the Japanese maple grow in great numbers and are visited by mountain climbers in all seasons.

Flora 
The mountain is covered by old-growth forest. Typical species include Japanese beech and Tsuga. Going up from the lowland, the vegetation changes from evergreen (glossy-leaved) forest over conifer forest halfway up the mountain, to Suzu-take and beech close to the summit. Angelica ubatakensis is only found on parts of Shikoku and in the Sobo mountain range is a precious plant. The pseudonym of Mount Sobo,  (uba meaning "elderly woman" in Japanese), goes back to the discoverer of the plant, Tomitaro Makino, who called it that.

Fauna 
Even though sightings have been rare in recent years, the Asian black bear is believed to be living here as well. In addition Japanese dormice and sika deer can be seen.

Mining 
At the foot of Mount Sobo lie the remains of the Obira mine. From its opening in 1617 until its closing in 1954, it had been flourishing as the leading Japanese mine. The mines produce scarce minerals like copper, tin, lead, manganese and quartz.

History 
On August 30, 1945, a B-29 Superfortress of the United States Air Force on a supply flight crashed in bad weather in the neighbourhood of  located south of Mount Sobo. All twelve crew members died in the incident. Part of the fuselage and the Stars and Stripes still lie among the mountains. A Prayer for Peace monument was erected on August 26, 1995 to commemorate this event.

See also 
 100 Famous Japanese Mountains

References

External links 
 Topographic map

Mountains of Ōita Prefecture
Mountains of Miyazaki Prefecture